Nardući is a village in Vižinada municipality in Istria County, Croatia. It is approximately 250 kilometres west of the capital Zagreb

References

Populated places in Istria County